Polonais was a  74-gun ship of the line of the French Navy.

First named Glorieux, she was renamed on 23 February 1807.

In 1809, under Captain Mequet, she departed Lorient, France with Troude's squadron, bound for the Caribbean. On 29 March, the ships arrived at the Saintes and landed reinforcements.

On 29 May, Polonais and Courageux reached Cherbourg, France along with seven prize ships captured on the way. D'Hautpoul had been captured in the action of 14–17 April 1809.

In April 1814, at the Bourbon Restoration, Polonais was renamed Lys captained by Troude. She then ferried Louis XVIII back to France. She was briefly renamed Polonais during the Hundred Days of Napoleon, and then back to Lys again.

After the Bourbon Restoration, Lys was sent to retake possession of the island of Martinique, along with the frigate  and the corvette . The squadron arrived at Fort Royal on 5 October 1814.

From 1822, she was used as a storage hulk, and she was broken up in Brest on 1825.

References

Ships of the line of the French Navy
Téméraire-class ships of the line
1808 ships